Christopher Govedaris (born February 2, 1970) is a Canadian former professional ice hockey left winger.

Govedaris was born in Toronto, Ontario. As a youth, he played in the 1983 Quebec International Pee-Wee Hockey Tournament with the Toronto Marlboros minor ice hockey team. He was drafted in the first round, 11th overall, by the Hartford Whalers in the 1988 NHL Entry Draft. He played 45 games in the National Hockey League: 33 with the Whalers and 12 with the Toronto Maple Leafs.

Career statistics

International

References

External links

1970 births
Living people
Adirondack Red Wings players
Binghamton Whalers players
Canadian ice hockey left wingers
Eisbären Berlin players
Hamilton Dukes players
Hartford Whalers draft picks
Hartford Whalers players
Ice hockey people from Toronto
Milwaukee Admirals (IHL) players
Minnesota Moose players
National Hockey League first-round draft picks
St. John's Maple Leafs players
Springfield Indians players
Toronto Maple Leafs players
Toronto Marlboros players
Canadian expatriate ice hockey players in Germany